Honey on His Hands is a studio album by American country music artist Jeanne Pruett. It was released in June 1975 on MCA Records and was produced by Walter Haynes. The album was Pruett's fourth studio release and contained ten tracks previously not released. It would also be her final album release with the MCA label. Honey on His Hands spawned four singles that charted on the Billboard country survey.

Background and content
Honey on His Hands was recorded between 1974 and 1975 at Bradley's Barn, a studio located in Mount Juliet, Tennessee. The sessions were produced by Walter Haynes. He had produced Pruett's previous three album releases on the MCA label. The album was a collection of ten tracks. Four of the album's tracks were written by Pruett herself, including "A Poor Man's Woman". The latter track would later be released as a single. The remainder of the album's material was new songs written by other Nashville songwriters. Other country music composers included on the album were Max D. Barnes, Ben Peters and Troy Seals. Both Barnes and Seals composed the album's title track, which would also be issued as single.

Release and reception
Honey on His Hands was released in June 1975 on MCA Records. It was Pruett's fourth studio album released in her music career. The album was issued as a vinyl record, containing five songs on "side one" and "side two". It spent a total of four weeks on the Billboard Top Country Albums before only reaching a peak position of 48 in August 1975. Despite a low-chart performance the album received a positive response from music critics. Billboard magazine reviewed the album favorably in 1975, praising the title track.

Honey on His Hands would spawn four single released between 1974 and 1975. All the singles issued became minor hits on the country charts. "Welcome to the Sunshine (Sweet Baby Jane)" was the first single issued. Released in August 1974, the song peaked at number 22 on the Billboard Hot Country Singles after 15 weeks. It also peaked at number 24 on the Canadian RPM Country Songs chart. "Just Like Your Daddy" was released in December 1974 as the second single from the album. After spending 15 weeks on the same chart, the song reached number 25 by March 1975. Also in March 1975, the title track was issued as the album's third single. After nine weeks, the song peaked at number 41 on the country songs chart. In July 1975, the final single released was "A Poor Man's Woman". The song peaked at number 24 on the Billboard country singles chart by September. "A Poor Man's Woman" also reached number 46 on the RPM country songs chart in Canada.

Track listing

Personnel
All credits are adapted from the liner notes of Honey on His Hands.

Musical personnel

 Brenton Banks – violin
 Ana Barak – viola
 George Binkley – violin
 Harold Bradley – guitar
 Winnie Breast – background vocals
 Marvin Chantry – viola
 Roy Christensen – cello
 Dorothy Deleonibus – background vocals
 Ray Edenton – guitar
 Buddy Emmons – steel guitar
 Carol Gorodetzky – violin
 Lloyd Green – steel guitar
 Buddy Harman – drums
 Herman Harper – background vocals
 Larrie Howard – violin
 The Jordanaires – background vocals
 Martin Katahn – violin

 Millie Kirkham – background vocals
 Sheldon Kurland – violin
 Mike Leech – bass
 Kenny Malone – drums
 Martha McCrory – cello
 Bob Moore – bass
 Laverna Moore – background vocals
 Grady Martin – guitar
 Jeanne Pruett – lead vocals, background vocals
 Bill Purcell – piano
 Hargus "Pig" Robbins – piano
 Jerry Shook – guitar
 Jerry Smith – organ
 Steven Smith – violin
 Henry Strzelecki – bass
 Duane West – background vocals
 Bergen White – background vocals

Technical personnel
 Bobby Bradley – engineering
 Herb Burnette – photography 
 Vic Gabany – engineering
 Walter Haynes – producer
 Darrell Johnson – mastering
 Joe Mills – engineering
 Tom Wilkes – photography

Chart performance

Release history

References

1975 albums
Jeanne Pruett albums
MCA Records albums